The Bataan Refinery is an oil refinery in Limay, Bataan, Philippines. It is owned and operated by Petron Corporation and is the largest oil refinery in the Philippines with the capacity to process . It began operation in 1961.

History
The Bataan Refinery was originally owned by Stanvac. Construction of the refinery began in 1957 and was inaugurated on April 8, 1961 by then Philippine President Carlos P. Garcia. It was later acquired by Esso Philippines, Inc. which later became Petron Corporation.

The site is powered by a 140-MV solid fuel-fired power plant of Petron which was briefly owned by SMC Powergen from 2013 to 2016.. SMC Powergen expanded the power plant's capacity from 70-MV in 2014.

Fuel marking at the refinery was adopted in January 2020 to support the government's effort against fuel smuggling.

Due to low demand of oil caused by the COVID-19 pandemic the oil refinery temporarily ceased operations in May 2020 The refinery resumed operations in September 2020. The refinery temporary cease operations again from February to May 2021 and resumed commercial operations in June 2021. Petron announced that it would be building a new 184MW power plant to replace the older facilities of the refinery.

References

Oil refineries in the Philippines
Buildings and structures in Bataan
1961 establishments in the Philippines